Macon County Airport  is a public use airport in Macon County, North Carolina, United States. Owned by the Macon County Airport Authority, it is located three nautical miles (6 km) northwest of central business district of Franklin, North Carolina, in the Iotla Valley of the Great Smoky Mountains. This airport is included in the National Plan of Integrated Airport Systems for 2017–2021, which categorized it as a general aviation facility.

Facilities and aircraft 
Macon County Airport covers an area of 110 acres (45 ha) at an elevation of 2,020 feet (616 m) above mean sea level. It has one runway designated 7/25 with an asphalt surface measuring 5,000 by 100 feet (1,524 x 30 m).

For the 12-month period ending March 9, 2015, the airport had 12,250 aircraft operations, an average of 34 per day: 98% general aviation and 2% military.
In January 2017, there were 18 aircraft based at this airport: 15 single-engine and 3 multi-engine.

References

External links 
  at North Carolina DOT airport guide
 Aerial image as of April 1994 from USGS The National Map
 
 

Airports in North Carolina
Transportation in Macon County, North Carolina
Buildings and structures in Macon County, North Carolina